The 2013 O'Byrne Cup is a Gaelic football competition played by the teams of Leinster GAA. The competition differs from the Leinster Senior Football Championship as it also features further education colleges and the winning team does not progress to another tournament at All-Ireland level. The O'Byrne Cup began on 6 January 2013 and was competed on a round robin basis, the top team in each group qualifying for the semi-finals. Kildare were the winners.

Group A

Group B

Group C

Group D

Finals

See also
 2013 Dr McKenna Cup

References

External links
Fixtures

O'Byrne Cup
O'Byrne Cup